WIBB-FM (97.9 MHz) is a radio station serving the Macon, Georgia, USA, area with a mainstream urban format. This station is under the ownership of iHeartMedia, Inc.

Notable DJ
Rob Redding

External links
WIBB-FM official website

IBB-FM
Mainstream urban radio stations in the United States
IHeartMedia radio stations